Isaac Kwain (born 11 November 1994) is a Ghanaian professional footballer who plays as a defender for Ghanaian Premier League side Aduana Stars. He previously played for Karela United, Ebusua Dwarfs and Real Tamale United.

Club career

Real Tamale United 
Kwain started his career with Northern Region-based side Real Tamale United, before joining Ebusua Dwarfs. He played for the Tamale team from 2011 to 2013.

Ebusua Dwarfs 
Kwain joined Cape Coast Ebusua Dwarfs in 2013. He featured for the club in the 2016 and 2017 Ghana Premier League seasons. In the 2016 season he played 13 matches and in the 2017 season, he played 24 matches, scored 2 goals and made three assists. On 23 July 2017, he scored a goal in the 2–2 draw against Wa All Stars. At the end of the season, he was linked to several moves to other Ghana Premier League teams including newly promoted sides Techiman Eleven Wonders and Karela United.

Karela United 
On 19 December 2018, Kwain joined Karela United on a two-year deal ahead of the GHALCA Top 8 competition. He signed his contract on time to join them for their pre-season tour in Ivory Coast. In the 2019 GFA Normalization Committee Special Competition, he played 13 matches and scored 1 goal, helping Karela United to finish in second place in group A and qualify for the play-offs only to lose the final to Kumasi Asante Kotoko.

Aduana Stars 
In December 2019, ahead of the 2019–20 Ghana Premier League season, Kwain switched sides to Dormaa-based side Aduana Stars, after he signed a three-year contract upon the expiration of his contract with Karela United. He played 14 matches and scored a goal during the 2019–20 season before the league was suspended as a result of the COVID-19 pandemic. With the league set to restart he made the squad list for the 2020–21 Ghana Premier League season.

International career 
After an his impressive performance during the 2019 GFA Normalization Competition, in August 2019, Kwain received a call-up to the Ghana A' national football team, the Local Black Stars for the 2020 CHAN qualifiers and was a member of the preliminary 2019 WAFU Cup of Nations squad.

References

External links 

 
 

Living people
1994 births
Association football defenders
Ghanaian footballers
Real Tamale United players
Ebusua Dwarfs players
Karela United FC players
Aduana Stars F.C. players
Ghana Premier League players